The 1928 Detroit Wolverines season was their first and only season in the league, after relocating from Cleveland in the offseason. The team went 7–2–1,  finishing third in the league; their two losses came to Frankford and Providence, the NFL's top two teams.

The Wolverines, led by star quarterback Benny Friedman, also met the New York Giants twice: an easy 28-0 win in Detroit and a 19-19 tie (a “Scorigami” as this is so far the only game in NFL history to end with this score) at the Polo Grounds in New York. Ironically, this proved to be the team's downfall, as the Wolverines piqued the interest of Giants owner Tim Mara, who wanted to acquire Friedman and Detroit's other star players. 

Mara did so by buying the entire Detroit franchise, and promptly shutting it down, thus delivering Friedman et al to New York.

The NFL would not return to the Motor City until 1934, when the Portsmouth Spartans moved to Detroit and were rebranded as the Lions.

Schedule

Standings

Players
Carl Bacchus, kicker, 9 games, 204 pounds, 6-0, Missouri	
Rip Bachor, tackle, 1 game, 215 pounds, 6-0, Univ. of Detroit
John Barrett, center, 5 games, 170 pounds, 5-6, Univ. of Detroit
Les Caywood, guard, 9 games, 230 pounds, 6-0, St. John's (NY)
Tom Cobb, tackle, 9 games, 250 pounds, 5-11, St. John's (NY)
Tiny Feather, fullback, 10 games, 197 games, 6-0, Kansas St.
Benny Friedman, quarterback, 10 games, 183 pounds, 5-10, Michigan
Dosey Howard, guard, 9 games, 225 pounds, 6-0, Marietta
Pete Jackson, 5 games, 200 pounds, 5-10, Missouri
Lyle Munn, end, 10 games, 186 pounds, 6-0, Kansas St.
Bill Owen, tackle, 10 games, 211 pounds, 6-0, Oklahoma St., Phillips
Proc Randels, end, 10 games, 180 pounds, 6-0, Kansas St.
Eddie Scharer, 7 games, 165 pounds, 5-6, Univ. of Detroit, Notre Dame
Len Sedbrook, wingback, 9 games, 174 pounds, 5-10, Phillips
Rex Thomas, wingback, 10 games, 174 pounds, 5-9, Tulsa, St. John's (NY)
Ernie Vick, center, 6 games, 190 pounds, 5-10, Michigan	
Ossie Wiberg, back, 10 games, 207 pounds, 5-11, Nebraska Wesleyan
Chet Widerquist, tackle, 4 games, 219 pounds, 6-1, Northwestern, Washington & Jefferson
Joe Wostoupal, center, 8 games, 208 pounds, 6-3, Nebraska

References

Detroit Wolverines
W
Detroit seasons (1920s NFL teams)